Rabbi Nachman of Horodenka (died 1765) was a Hasidic leader.

At first, Rabbi Nachman was among the Talmidei Chachamim who gathered to study Torah in Brody. After experiencing a dream which he interpreted as a signal for him to go to the Baal Shem Tov, Rabbi Nachman became a close disciple and one of the first supporters of the Baal Shem Tov.

After marrying off his son to the granddaughter of the Baal Shem Tov, he moved to the Land of Israel, arriving at the port of Haifa in 1764. At first he lived in Safed, and afterward he settled in Tiberias. He died in Tiberias in June, 1765, and was buried in Tiberias.

Rabbi Nachman was a seventh-generation lineal descendant of Rabbi Judah Loew ben Bezalel. Rabbi Nachman's grandson was Rabbi Nachman of Breslov.

References 

1765 deaths
Hasidic rebbes
People from Brody
People from Horodenka
People from Tiberias
Place of birth missing
Year of birth missing